Hillside letters or mountain monograms are a form of geoglyph (more specifically hill figures) common in the Western United States, consisting of large single letters, abbreviations, or messages emblazoned on hillsides, typically created and maintained by schools or towns. There are approximately 500 of these geoglyphs, ranging in size from a few feet to hundreds of feet tall. They form an important part of the western cultural landscape, where they function as symbols of school pride and civic identity.

History

A myth that hillside letters were built to identify communities from the air for early pilots who air-dropped mail is untrue. The first three mountain monograms built were constructed to end rivalries between different graduating classes at universities. Letters have also been erected to celebrate winning teams, to commemorate the building of high schools, in memory of local community members, and as Boy Scout projects.

The first hillside letter built is the "L" in 1904 representing Lahainaluna High School. This 30 foot letter "L" at about the 2000 ft level on Mt Ball, part of the West Maui Mountains was created by students of Lahainaluna High School by clearing the plants and weeds and adding lime to prevent regrowth. It is still lit up annually during graduation ceremonies.

The second hillside letter was built by University of California-Berkeley students was in March 1905. The letter C was constructed out of concrete and placed on Charter Hill overlooking the UC Berkeley. The UC Berkeley classes of 1907 and 1908 proposed this project as a means of ending the rivalry and the unruly physical encounters that had become a part of their annual rush each spring. The UC Berkeley yearbook recorded that the two classes would go down in the history of the University as those who sacrificed their class spirit for love of their alma mater.

In 1906, Brigham Young University in Provo, Utah, proposed and surveyed the first three-lettered hillside emblem BYU, but reduced it to the single letter Y after realizing the amount of labor involved. The following year, the class rivalry of the sophomores and freshmen at the University of Utah in Salt Lake City produced a hillside U on Mount Van Cott overlooking Salt Lake City. The M of the Colorado School of Mines in Golden, Colorado, became the nation’s fourth hillside letter in 1908, and it has been illuminated every night since the early 1930s. A few years later, high schools began building hillside letters; the first one was a T for Tintic High School in Eureka, Utah, built in 1912.

By the 1920s and 1930s, letters were being rapidly constructed across the West. Although the pace has slowed since then, newly constructed letters continue to appear today. Meanwhile, many letters are fading due to lack of maintenance (especially in cases where the school that created the letter has closed), or have been removed outright due to environmental concerns or changing aesthetic preferences.

Distribution

More than 500 Hillside letters and messages can be found across the United States; the total is approximate because the various published lists do not completely coincide, and extensive travel would be needed to verify all rumored letters. The most prolific states are (numbers are approximate):
 California: 81 (detailed list)
 Montana: 80 (detailed list)
 Utah: 78 (detailed list)
 Arizona: 59 (detailed list)
 Nevada: 47 (detailed list)
 Oregon: 36 (detailed list)
 Idaho: 34 (detailed list)
 New Mexico: 32 (detailed list)
 Colorado: 24 (detailed list)
 Wyoming: 22 (detailed list)
 Washington: 20 (detailed list)
 Texas: 17 (detailed list)

The densest concentrations are in Utah and Idaho and surrounding the Los Angeles Basin. A few letters may be found east of these states, such as the Platte Mound M in Platteville, Wisconsin and a C (for Columbia University) along the Harlem River in New York City. The phenomenon has spread to Alberta, Canada; Hawaii; and Australia.

Construction
 

Hillside letters are typically built in three different manners:

 Built-up letters made from rocks and concrete are the most common. Other materials such as wood, old car tires, metal, and vinyl have also been used. The M in Missoula, Montana, for the University of Montana, is an example of a built-up letter.
 Painted letters are typically found on bare rock faces and cliffs, as is the G in Gap, Arizona.
 Cutout letters, the least common, are formed by removing the vegetation to create a letter; the R for the University of Redlands in Redlands, California, is an example.

These emblems can range in size from 10 or 15 feet tall to hundreds of feet tall. The largest include the L for Lassen High School in Susanville, California (580 feet long), the R for University of Redlands in Redlands, California (430 feet long), the W for Western Colorado University in Gunnison, Colorado (420 feet long), and the Y for Brigham Young University in Provo, Utah (380 feet long). In addition to single letters and abbreviations, full messages have been placed on hillsides using similar methods, such as "SAN LUIS OLDEST TOWN IN COLO." in San Luis, Colorado, "WELCOME TO HERSHEY" in Hershey, Pennsylvania, and "MOUNT PANORAMA" (with "BATHURST" temporarily added on at least two occasions) in Bathurst, New South Wales, Australia. The famous HOLLYWOOD sign built in 1923 to advertise the Hollywoodland Real Estate Group is not technically a hillside letter, but rather a billboard.

Every letter of the alphabet is found as a single letter on a hillside except for X. Two X’s do appear within words on hillsides: DIXIE in St. George, Utah, and PHOENIX near Phoenix, Arizona. The letter M is the most common hillside letter.

Cultural significance

In the beginning, hillside letters were often constructed in an area of local historical or cultural significance to the community, but as time went on environmental laws became more restrictive and the location of the letters had as much to do with securing legal permits as selecting the best location. In some cases, it has taken years before permission to construct or revitalize a hillside letter has been given.

The voice of opposition seems to be a common element of most hillside letters. Even back in 1905, some of the residents of Berkeley immediately opposed the building of the C, believing it would destroy the natural beauty of the hillside. Yet, as time passes these controversial giant emblems often become the most cherished landmarks of a community or school. This pride is heightened by the time and commitment it takes to build and maintain the letter and the traditions, such as painting, lighting, and other annual activities, that endear a letter to its supporters. When the University of Utah needed to stabilize their crumbling hillside U in 2006, supportive school and community members donated over $200,000 more than was needed for the project. When the 76-year-old G in Moab, Utah, disappeared under a coat of reddish brown paint, thought to be applied by some environmentally motivated newcomers to town, there was not only an immediate outcry from the community, but a reward to find the culprits.

Hillside letters have also been battlegrounds for rival schools and places to display patriotic pride or discontent over political actions. Some letters are painted and lighted to celebrate various holidays and community events, and others have been used to honor local fallen heroes. In the days and weeks after September 11, 2001, dozens of letters were temporarily repainted in red, white, and blue. Over the past century, hillside letters have impacted not just the landscape, but the culture of many communities throughout the American West, as well. The ubiquity of these letters in the rural West is evidenced by the appearance in the movie Cars (2006) of an "RS" overlooking the fictional Arizona town of Radiator Springs.

See also
Tempe Butte (Known locally as 'A Mountain'), Tempe, Arizona 
Battalion Park, Calgary, Alberta, Canada
The Big "C", Berkeley, California
Block U, Salt Lake City, Utah
 C-Rock, New York City
Canisteo Living Sign
Daimonji
Groudle Glen railway station, Isle of Man – features "GROUDLE".
Hill figure
Hollywood Sign, Los Angeles, California
Platte Mound M, Platteville, Wisconsin
South San Francisco hillside sign, South San Francisco, CA
Y Mountain, Provo, Utah

Notes

External links
Hillside Letters Collection, an interactive map of the letters in the U.S. and Canada that is roughly complete.
Mountain Monograms, A website explaining the origins and with an incomplete list and pictures
Hillside Letters, a companion website to a book on the subject.
Letters on Hills, a category on waymarking.com for geocachers.
Modern Geoglyphs, A compilation of geoglyphs in Montana with photos and maps.
Nevada's Hillside Letters, A Google map showing most hillside letters in Nevada.

Hill figures
Geoglyphs